Pareuthria plicatula is a species of sea snail, a marine gastropod mollusk in the family Cominellidae.

Description

Distribution

References

Cominellidae
Gastropods described in 1912